Frederick Haynes (1832–1897) was a British artist born at Carrington, Nottingham who primarily painted seascapes and portraits.

Although exhibited little in his lifetime, Haynes' work is now increasingly found in auction houses. His work "a fresh breeze, shipping off the South Foreland" sold at Sotheby's London 'The Marine Sale' in 2000 for $10,866.

Haynes had a son, also called Frederick Haynes, who himself became a portrait painter and photographer.

References 

British marine artists
1832 births
1897 deaths
Artists from Nottingham
Date of birth missing
Date of death missing
People from Nottingham (district)